Transcriptional enhancer factor TEF-3 is a protein that in humans is encoded by the TEAD4 gene.

Function 

This gene product is a member of the transcriptional enhancer factor (TEF) family of transcription factors, which contain the TEA/ATTS DNA-binding domain. Members of the family in mammals are TEAD1, TEAD2, TEAD3, TEAD4. TEAD4 is preferentially expressed in the skeletal muscle, and binds to the M-CAT regulatory element found in promoters of muscle-specific genes to direct their gene expression. Alternatively spliced transcripts encoding distinct isoforms, some of which are translated through the use of a non-AUG (UUG) initiation codon, have been described for this gene. Gene ablation experiments in mice (i.e. knockout mice) showed that TEAD4 is essential for the formation of blastocysts during preimplantation embryo development. Although it was originally hypothesized to be essential for specification of trophectoderm lineage, it was later shown that functional trophectoderm can be produced leading to formation of blastocysts under in vitro conditions that suppress oxidative stress. Transcriptional coregulators, such as WWTR1 (TAZ) bind to members in this transcription factor family.

References

Further reading

External links 
 

Transcription factors